James Dwyer (1881 – 17 December 1932) was an Irish politician and farmer. He was first elected to Dáil Éireann as a Cumann na nGaedheal Teachta Dála (TD) for the Leix–Offaly constituency at the Leix–Offaly by-election on 18 February 1926 caused by the disqualification of Seán McGuinness of Sinn Féin. He was re-elected at the June 1927 and September 1927 general elections but lost his seat at the 1932 general election.

References

1881 births
1932 deaths
Cumann na nGaedheal TDs
Members of the 4th Dáil
Members of the 5th Dáil
Members of the 6th Dáil
Irish farmers